PrintMaster was a greeting card and banner creation program for Commodore 64, Amiga, Apple II and IBM PC computers.  PrintMaster sold more than two million copies.

History
In 1986, PrintMaster was the target of a lawsuit by Broderbund, who alleged that PrintMaster was a direct copy of their popular The Print Shop program. The court found in favor of Broderbund, locating specific instances of copying.

Since the early 1990s, the name has been used for a basic desktop publishing software package, under the Broderbund brand.  It was unique in that it provided libraries of clip-art and templates through a simple interface to build signs, greeting cards, posters and banners with household dot-matrix printers. Over the years, it was updated to accommodate changing file formats and printer technologies, including CD and DVD labels and inserts and photobook pages. PrintMaster is available in Platinum and Gold variants.

PrintMaster 2.0 is the first consumer desktop publishing solution at retail to offer Macintosh and Windows compatibility and integrated professional printing.

In September 2010, PrintMaster 2011 was released.  Versions include Platinum, Gold, and Express for digital download.

PrintMaster project types include banners, calendars, crafts, greeting cards, invitations, labels, signs, and scrapbook pages.

References
The Broderbund line of products is published by Encore, Inc.

External links
 www.printmaster.com

Desktop publishing software
1985 software

ja:プリントショップ